Luciano Pistoi (1927 in Rome – 1995 in Siena) was an Italian art critic, dealer, journalist, publisher, promoter and organizer of cultural events. He is considered one of the most prominent figures in the postwar Italian art world.

Pistoi was born in Rome into a family of Tuscan origins. In the early 1950s he moved to Turin where he started working as an art critic for the newspaper L'Unità.

In 1957 he opened his first gallery called Galleria Notizie with an exhibition of Wols. He subsequently presented artists such as Jean Fautrier, Jackson Pollock, Alberto Burri, Lucio Fontana, Jean Dubuffet, Olga Jevric, George Mathieu, Norman Bluhm, Mark Tobey, Spazzapan, Imai, Antoni Tàpies, Carla Accardi, Pinot Gallizio, Cy Twombly, Asger Jorn, Shiraga, Giovanni Paolo Pannini, Riopelle, Sam Francis, Louise Nevelson, Salvatore Scarpitta, Fausto Melotti, and Mario Merz. He also collaborated with many international art dealers, including Arne Glimcher, Ernst Beyeler, Paul Maenz, Niccolò Sprovieri, Plinio De Martiis, Gasparo del Corso, and Alexander Jolas.

In 1959 he organized the first European exhibition of the Japanese group Gutai and the exhibition "Arte Nuova" (New Art) in collaboration with the French critic Michel Tapié.

From the early 1960s Pistoi was interested in work by young artists like Piero Manzoni, Pino Pascali, Giulio Paolini, Luciano Fabro and Christo, parallel to his focus on protagonists of the European avant-gardes such as Francis Picabia, René Magritte, Fernand Léger, and Yves Tanguy.

In the 1970s he started organizing an exhibition that would take place every year in the medieval town of Castello di Volpaia near Siena.

Italian art critics
Italian art historians
Italian art curators
Italian art dealers
Italian male journalists
1927 births
1995 deaths
People of Tuscan descent
20th-century Italian journalists
20th-century Italian male writers